The Cathedral of St. John the Baptist is a parish of the Roman Catholic Church in Fira, on the island of Santorini in Greece. It serves as the cathedral of the Roman Catholic Diocese of Santorini (Dioecesis Sanctoriensis or Επισκοπή Θήρας) which was created in 1204.

The cathedral is located in the city center, in the Catholic neighborhood. The current church, a baroque structure of blue-gray and cream, was built in 1823. It was completely restored and rebuilt in 1970, after the earthquake of 1956.

See also
Catholic Church in Greece

References

John the Baptist
Churches in Santorini
Roman Catholic churches completed in 1823
19th-century Roman Catholic church buildings in Greece